Håkan Rosengren is a Swedish clarinet virtuoso, active in the United States and Europe.

Colleagues
He has worked with:
Esa-Pekka Salonen
Neeme Järvi
Christopher Hogwood
Osmo Vänskä
Jorma Panula
Pascal Verrot
Jan Krenz
Matthias Aeschbacher
Okko Kamu
Keith Clark
Sakari Oramo
Leif Segerstam 

in performances with the: 
Helsinki Philharmonic
Swedish Radio Symphony
Royal Stockholm Philharmonic
Odense Symphony
Helsingborg Symphony
Royal Swedish Chamber
Norrköping Symphony
Southern Jutland Symphony
Jönköping Symphony
Umeå Sinfonietta
Malmö Symphony Orchestras

Discography
Nielsen:Clarinet Concerto/Flute Concerto (Sony) 1993 
Bernhard Henrik Crusell: Works for Clarinet (Musica Sveciae) 1993
Festival (Stereophile) 1995
Schönberg/Martinu/Messiaen (Caprice) 1996
Mendelssohn Concert Pieces, Brahms Sonata in E flat and Crusell Duet no. 1, 2 and 3 for two clarinets (Nytorp Musik) 1997
Grand Duo: Selections of German Music for Clarinet and Piano (Nytorp Musik) 1999
Olivier Messiaen: Quatuor pour la Fin du Temps (CD Accord) 2001
Bernhard Henrik Crusell: Concerto in B flat Major/Quartets op. 2 and op. 4 (Caprice) 2002
Saint Saens Sonata, Debussy Premiere rhapsody, Francaix Tema con variazioni, Messager Solo de Concours and other French music (SMS Classical) 2006
Brahms, Mozart: Quintets for Clarinet and Strings (SMS Classical) 2006
Brahms: Sonatas Op. 120; Rhapsodies Op. 79 (Round Top Records) 2006
Carl Maria von Weber: Concertos for clarinet and orchestra (SMS Classical) 2008
Frank Ticheli: Concerto for clarinet and wind band (SMS Classical) 2011

Concerto solo performances 
Rosengren’s concerto solo performances in Europe have taken him to the:
Lausanne Chamber Orchestra
Lithuanian National Symphony
Prague Philharmonic
Lisbon Metropolitan Orchestra
Porto Chamber Orchestra
Amadeus Chamber Orchestra
Slovakia Radio Symphony
Aukso Chamber Orchestra
Poznan Philharmonic
Polish Chamber Philharmonic

Elsewhere he has appeared with the: 
Los Angeles Mozart Orchestra
Minas Gerais Symphony (Brazil)
Savannah Symphony
Akron Symphony
Asheville Symphony
Texas Festival Orchestra
Midland-Odessa Symphony
New West Symphony
Israeli Chamber Orchestra

References

Living people
Swedish clarinetists
California State University, Fullerton faculty
Classical clarinetists
21st-century clarinetists
Year of birth missing (living people)